Overton is a civil parish in Lancaster, Lancashire, England. It contains 29 buildings that are recorded in the National Heritage List for England as designated listed buildings.  Of these, one is at Grade II*, the middle grade, and the others are at Grade II, the lowest grade.

The parish contains the village of Overton, and the listed buildings in and around the village are mainly houses and farmhouses, together with a church and the remains of a cross.  To the southwest of the village is the peninsula of Sunderland Point, between the mouth of the River Lune and Morecambe Bay.  In the early 18th century it was the site of the port for Lancaster and a ship building yard.  Following the development of Glasson Dock in the 1780s it became redundant, but a small community remains there.  The wharf is listed, together with a number of houses, some of which have been converted from former warehouses, and a mission church.

Key

Buildings

References

Citations

Sources

Lists of listed buildings in Lancashire
Buildings and structures in the City of Lancaster